The Armenia Fault is an oblique sinistral strike-slip fault in the department of Quindío in west-central Colombia. The fault shows Holocene activity with a surface rupture produced in 2001.

Etymology 
The fault is named after Armenia, the capital of Quindío.

Description 

The Armenia Fault is part of the Romeral Fault System on the western slope of the Central Ranges of the Colombian Andes. The geometric and neotectonic features of the Montenegro and Armenia Faults are very similar.

The Armenia Fault deforms Quaternary volcano-sedimentary debris flow and pyroclastic flow deposits. The valley of the Quindío River follows the strike of the Armenia Fault.

Activity 
The fault is considered active with Holocene tectonic movement. A maximum moment magnitude of 6.5 to 6.8 and recurrence interval of 1000 years is estimated for this fault, based on the length of Quaternary rupture and displacement of topographic features at the fault.

See also 

 List of earthquakes in Colombia
 Córdoba-Navarco Fault

References

Bibliography

Maps

Further reading 
 

Seismic faults of Colombia
Strike-slip faults
Normal faults
Active faults
Faults
Earthquakes in Colombia